South River may refer to:

In Canada
 South River, Newfoundland and Labrador, a town
 South River, Ontario, a village
 South River (Ontario), a tributary of Lake Nipissing
 South River, former name of the Koksoak River in Quebec

In China
Rong River (Guangdong), also known as South River

In the United States
Delaware River, referred to as the South River in colonial times
Georgia
South River (Darien River tributary)
South River (Ocmulgee River tributary)
Iowa
South River (Iowa), a tributary of the Des Moines River
Maryland
South River (Maryland), a tributary of Chesapeake Bay
South River, Maryland, a community in Anne Arundel County
Massachusetts
South River (Deerfield River tributary), see List of rivers of Massachusetts
South River (Massachusetts Bay), see List of rivers of Massachusetts
New Hampshire and Maine
South River (Ossipee River tributary)
New Jersey
South River (Great Egg Harbor River tributary)
South River (Raritan River tributary)
South River, New Jersey, a borough in Middlesex County named after the river
North Carolina
South River (North Carolina), a tributary of the Black River
South River (Neuse River estuary)
Virginia
South River (Mattaponi River tributary)
South River (Maury River tributary)
South River (Rapidan River tributary)
South River (South Fork Shenandoah River tributary)

See also
South (disambiguation)